Shah Budak was a bey of Beylik of Dulkadir, a Turkish beylik (principality) in Anatolia

Background
Dulkadir was a semi independent beylik under the sovereignty of the Mamluk Egypt. The beylik was located around Kahramanmaraş and Elbistan, which made the beylik a buffer territory of the Mamluks against the Ottoman Empire.

First term
Melik Aslan, Shah Budak's elder brother was the bey of the Dulkarids. After he was defeated by Uzun Hasan, the sultan of the Akkoyunlu, ( a Turkmen sultanate in the East Anatolia) Melik Aslan went to Cairo to seek support. In Cairo, Shah Budak killed him and the Mamluks appointed Shah Budak as the new bey in 1465. But in his beylik he was accused of being a brother murderer and in the battle fought around the Zamantı River,  he was defeated by his other brother Şahsuvar who had the support of the Ottoman Empire. In 1467, he escaped to Egypt.

Second term
In 1472, Şahsuvar was deposed and later executed by the Mamluks and Shah Budak once again was appointed as the new bey. However Ottomans were displeased to see the end of their candidate. They supported Bozkurt (or Alahüddevle), a  third brother of Shah Budak to throne. In 1480 Bozkurt defeated Shah Budak and became the new bey.

References

15th-century births
Dulkadirids
Turkic rulers
Anatolian beyliks
15th-century monarchs in Asia
Year of death missing